is the 13th major single by the Japanese idol group AKB48, released on August 26, 2009. It was the first AKB48's single which participating members were chosen by election. The single surprisingly outsold SMAP on its first day, taking the 1st place in the daily chart, but eventually placed 2nd in the Oricon Weekly Singles Chart. Their sister groups JKT48, SNH48, MNL48, AKB48 Team SH and BNK48 made their own version.

Track listing 

Regular Edition 
CD

DVD

Bonus (First press limited edition only)
 Handshake event ticket

Theater Edition 
CD
See Regular Edition CD

Members 
Participating members were chosen by election. Top 21 members sang the A-side "Iiwake Maybe". Those, who were voted 22nd to 30th, sang the B-side "Tobenai Agehachō" under the name of Under Girls.

"Iiwake Maybe" 
 Atsuko Maeda (Team A) (4630 votes)
 Yūko Ōshima (Team K) (3345)
 Mariko Shinoda (Team A) (2852)
 Mayu Watanabe (Team B) (2625)
 Minami Takahashi (Team A) (2614)
 Haruna Kojima (Team A) (2543)
 Tomomi Itano (Team A) (2281)
 Amina Satō (Team A) (2117)
 Yuki Kashiwagi (Team B) (1920)
 Tomomi Kasai (Team K) (1890)
 Erena Ono (Team K) (1838)
 Sayaka Akimoto (Team K) (1599)
 Rie Kitahara (Team A) (1578)
 Sae Miyazawa (Team K) (1547)
 Yukari Satō (Team A) (1539)
 Minami Minegishi (Team A) (1414)
 Kazumi Urano (Team B) (1395)
 Miho Miyazaki (Team A) (1373)
 Jurina Matsui (SKE48) (1371)
 Aika Ōta (Team B) (1365)
 Asuka Kuramochi (Team K) (1355)

"Tobenai Agehachō" 
 Under Girls

Charts

Sales and certifications

References 

2009 singles
Songs with lyrics by Yasushi Akimoto
AKB48 songs
King Records (Japan) singles
2009 songs
MNL48 songs